Caramelization is a process of browning of sugar used extensively in cooking for the resulting sweet nutty flavor and brown color. The brown colors are produced by three groups of polymers: caramelans (C24H36O18), caramelens (C36H50O25), and caramelins (C125H188O80). As the process occurs, volatile chemicals such as diacetyl are released, producing the characteristic caramel flavor.

Like the Maillard reaction, caramelization is a type of non-enzymatic browning. Unlike the Maillard reaction, caramelization is  pyrolytic, as opposed to being a reaction with amino acids.

When caramelization involves the disaccharide sucrose, it is broken down into the monosaccharides fructose and glucose.

Process

Caramelization is a complex, poorly understood process that produces hundreds of chemical products, and includes the following types of reactions:
 equilibration of anomeric and ring forms
 sucrose inversion to fructose and glucose
 condensation reactions
 intramolecular bonding
 isomerization of aldoses to ketoses
 dehydration reactions
 fragmentation reactions
 unsaturated polymer formation

Effects of caramelization

The process is temperature-dependent. Specific sugars each have their own point at which the reactions begin to proceed readily. Impurities in the sugar, such as the molasses remaining in brown sugar, greatly speed the reactions.

Caramelization reactions are also sensitive to the chemical environment, and the reaction rate, or temperature at which reactions occur most readily, can be altered by controlling the level of acidity (pH). The rate of caramelization is generally lowest at near-neutral acidity (pH around 7), and accelerated under both acidic (especially pH below 3) and basic (especially pH above 9) conditions.

Uses in food

Caramelization is used to produce several foods, including:

 Caramel sauce, a sauce made with caramel
 Confiture de lait and Dulce de leche, caramelized, sweetened milk
 Caramel candies
 Crème caramel, and the similar crème brûlée, a custard dish topped with sugar caramelized with a blowtorch
 Caramelized onions, which are used in dishes like French onion soup. Onions require 30 to 45 minutes of cooking to caramelize.
 Caramelized potatoes
 Caramelized pears
 Cola, of which some brands use caramelized sugar in small amounts for color

See also 

 List of cooking techniques

References

External links

Caramelization at Science of Cooking

Cooking techniques
Culinary terminology

de:Karamellisieren